The U.S. Open Swimming Championships, or U.S. Open, is a championship meet organized by USA Swimming which is open to international teams/swimmers. It was first held in 1985, and was held annually in December through 2006. Beginning in 2007, the meet's first-weekend-of-December timing was given over to the resurrected USA Short Course Nationals, and the U.S. Open moved to being held on an as-needed basis (generally in years where the USA championship that is swum is closed or partially closed to foreign swimmers). Since 2007, the meet has been held in early August, in years where the U.S. Nationals are not held in August.

The meet is traditionally a long course (50m) meet, although twice has been swum short course meters (25m): in 1996 and in 1998 (the latter where it immediately followed a FINA Swimming World Cup meet).

Editions

Team Champions

U.S. Open records

Men

Women

References

U.S. Open
Recurring sporting events established in 1985
1985 establishments in the United States